Eufemio Raúl Fernández Cabral (born 21 March 1955) is a Paraguayan football midfielder who played for Paraguay in the 1986 FIFA World Cup. He also played for Club Guaraní.

References

External links
FIFA profile
 

1955 births
Living people
Sportspeople from Asunción
Paraguayan footballers
Association football midfielders
Paraguay international footballers
La Liga players
Valencia CF players
Segunda División players
Racing de Santander players
UD Almería players
Hércules CF players
Paraguayan Primera División players
Club Guaraní players
Primeira Liga players
Rio Ave F.C. players
1986 FIFA World Cup players
Paraguayan expatriate footballers
Paraguayan expatriate sportspeople in Portugal
Expatriate footballers in Portugal
Paraguayan expatriate sportspeople in Spain
Expatriate footballers in Spain